Osmington Mills is a coastal hamlet in the English county of Dorset.

Geology 
The coastline around Osmington Mills is part of Dorset's Jurassic Coast, and fossils can be found in the cliffs. The rocks consist of Kimmeridge Clay and the Corallian group from the Oxfordian (Upper Jurassic) and have an interesting trace fossil assemblage. To the west are Black Head and beyond that Redcliff Point, with fossils in the Upper Oxford Clay.

Tourism 
Osmington Mills is popular with tourists, providing facilities such as camping and caravan sites, a public house (of which the site has been traced back to the 13th century), and attractive coastal walks.

John Constable 
The area around Osmington Mills and Osmington Bay was painted by the English landscape artist John Constable in the early 19th century. He spent his honeymoon in the area in 1816. Paintings include:

 Osmington Bay
 A View of Osmington Bay
 Weymouth Bay from the Downs above Osmington Mills
 Weymouth Bay: Bowleaze Cove and Jordon Hill

See also 
 Geology of Dorset
 Trigoniidae, found particularly around Osmington Mills

Gallery

Further reading

References

External links

Villages in Dorset
Tourist attractions in Dorset
Populated coastal places in Dorset
Jurassic Coast